Maria-Anastasia (Mariana) Efstratiou (born 17 April 1955 in Athens) is a Greek singer, connected on several occasions with the Eurovision Song Contest. In 1987 she appeared as a backing singer for the duo Bang. Efstratiou won the Greek national song contest in 1989, overcoming Greek superstar Anna Vissi, and represented Greece in Lausanne with To Diko Sou Asteri. The song was placed ninth. In 1996, ERT selected her to represent Greece again, this time with the song Emis forame to himona anixiatika, but the song could only manage 14th place in Oslo.  Efstratiou sang three songs in the semi-finals of the Greek national contest in 1998, but none of them qualified for the final. She has worked with Mimis Plessas and she also appeared on stage on several occasions. She has published two records and a promo CD single. Her debut album features her cover of Twist in My Sobriety, originally sung by Tanita Tikaram. She has also participated in the theatrical play Pornographia by Manos Hatzidakis. Currently, she is the lead singer of the jazz ensemble Nova Mood.

Discography
 1982 - Pornografia (music and songs from the play by Manos Hatzidakis.
 1984 - Big Alice (as a band with Costas Bigalis)
 1984 - I Miss You/maxi single
 1985 - Talk About Love/maxi single
 1989 - Kathe telos einai mia arhi
 1993 - Giro apo esena
 1996 - Emis forame to himona anixiatika/promo single.

References 

1955 births
Living people
Eurovision Song Contest entrants of 1989
Eurovision Song Contest entrants of 1996
Eurovision Song Contest entrants for Greece
20th-century Greek women singers
Singers from Athens